Australia will compete at the 2022 World Athletics Championships in Eugene, United States, from 15 to 24 July 2022. Australia has entered 65 athletes.

Medalists

Entrants
 including alternates

Some athletes were selected for winning the 2022 Oceania Athletics Championships when they do not have the entry or the ranking standard.

Men

Track and road events

Field events

Combined events – Decathlon

Women

Track and road events

Field events

References

World Championships in Athletics
2022
Nations at the 2022 World Athletics Championships